Donald Maclean (1869–1943) was principal of the Free Church College in Edinburgh. He was appointed Professor of Church History and Church Principles in 1920, and principal in 1942, but died the following year. He also co-founded The Evangelical Quarterly.

References

Scottish Christian theologians
1869 births
1943 deaths
Presidents of Calvinist and Reformed seminaries
20th-century Ministers of the Free Church of Scotland